General Paige may refer to:

Emmett Paige Jr. (1931–2017), U.S. Army lieutenant general
Henry R. Paige (1904–1989), U.S. Marine Corps major general

See also
General Page (disambiguation)